Benoît Dutrizac (born September 2, 1961) is a Canadian journalist and commentator based in Quebec. He is best known as a television host in the 2000s, associated with the news-oriented talk shows Les Francs-Tireurs for Télé-Québec and Dutrizac for TQS.

He subsequently joined CHMP-FM, for whom he hosted a daily talk radio show. In this role he earned a reputation as a shock jock, causing controversy and earning reprimands from the Canadian Broadcast Standards Council for encouraging listeners to drive through the predominantly Jewish neighbourhood of Hampstead while loudly honking their horns to flout a municipal bylaw against noisy outdoor activity during Rosh Hashanah, a segment in which he angrily berated an immigrant owner of a convenience store for being unable to communicate in French, and an interview which sexualized the hijab of New Democratic Party candidate Samira Laouni during the 2008 Canadian federal election.

Dutrizac left CHMP-FM in 2017. The following year he joined QUB, Quebecor's new web radio startup, as a morning host.

References

Living people
1961 births
Canadian talk radio hosts
Canadian television talk show hosts
Canadian columnists
Université du Québec à Montréal alumni
Université de Montréal alumni
Journalists from Montreal
Shock jocks